Kalli Kalde (born 6 September 1967 in Tartu) is an Estonian painter, graphic artist and illustrator.

From 1982 to 1986 Kalli Kalde studied graphic design in Tartu Art School. In 1991 she graduated from Department of Drawing and Manual Training in Tallinn University.

Since 1988 she takes part in expositions.

Member of the Tartu Artists' Association since 1995 and member of the Association of Estonian Printmakers since 2013.

Artworks 
1998–99 Ceiling and wall paintings in Villa Ammende in Pärnu
2000 Ceiling paintings in Villa Salmela in Finland
2005 Illustrations for the book Two Suns by Jaan Kaplinski
2005 Ceiling and wall paintings for the Konuvere manor in Pärnumaa
2005,2006 Illustrations for the magazine Täheke
2006 Photos and layout for the book Silence into Colours by Jaan Kaplinski
2006 Illustrations for the book Northwind and Southwind by Jaan Kaplinski
2007 Illustrations for the book Evening is Appletree by Jaan Kaplinski
2008 Photos and layout for the book Another Side of Lake by Jaan Kaplinski
2009 Illustrations and layout for the book Bygoners by Jaan Kaplinski
2011 Illustrations for the book Fairytales of Love by Epp Petrone
2011 Illustrations for the book My Especial Child

References

External links 
sven vabar:Kalli Kalde
http://kalli.kalde.eu/about-me/

1967 births
Living people
Estonian illustrators
Estonian women illustrators
People from Tartu
Tallinn University alumni
20th-century Estonian painters
21st-century Estonian painters
20th-century Estonian women artists
21st-century Estonian women artists